The Play-offs of the 2006 Fed Cup Asia/Oceania Zone Group I were the final stages of the Group I Zonal Competition involving teams from Asia and Oceania. Using the positions determined in their pools, the nine teams faced off to determine their placing in the 2006 Fed Cup Asia/Oceania Zone Group I, the top country of each pool played for first and second placings, while the bottom two of each pool competed for fifth to eighth. The team that ended up placing first overall advanced to World Group play-offs, whilst those coming in seventh were relegated down to Group II for the next year.

Promotion play-offs
The first placed teams of each pool were placed against each other in two head-to-head rounds. The winner of the rounds advanced to the World Group II play-offs, where they would get a chance to advance to the World Group II for next year.

Australia vs. India

Third
As there was only three teams from Pool A as opposed to the four from Pool B, the second-placed team from Pool B had no equivalent to play against. Thus the Taiwanese were automatically allocated third place.

Relegation play-offs
The last and second-to-last placed teams of each pool were placed against each other in two head-to-head rounds. The losing team of the rounds were relegated to Group II for next year.

South Korea vs. Philippines

Uzbekistan vs. New Zealand

Final Placements

  advanced to the World Group Play-offs, and were drawn against , where they won 5–0. The team thus competed in the 2007 World Group II.
The New Zealands placed fifth overall, but the Filipinos did not compete.

See also
Fed Cup structure

References

External links
 Fed Cup website

2006 Fed Cup Asia/Oceania Zone